Thomas Hjalmar Maloney Westgård (born 10 October 1995) is a Norwegian-Irish cross-country skier who competes for Ireland internationally.

Westgård was born and grew up in Leka, Norway. His father is Norwegian, and his mother is Irish, and he is a dual citizen of Ireland and Norway. He began skiing competitively in Norway at age 16 or 17. In the summer of 2016, he began representing Ireland in the World Cup. Westgård had begun his nationality transfer process in 2014, and was assisted in the process by Rory Morrish, the head of the Irish Skiing Federation. In local competitions in Norway, he represents the ski club Steinkjer SK in Steinkjer, Norway. Westgård's mother's family name is Maloney, and the Snowsports Association of Ireland refer to him as Thomas Maloney Westgaard.

Westgård lives in Meråker, Norway, and is being trained by the retired champion cross-country skier Frode Estil. Since joining the Irish skiing team, Westgård has participated in the 2016–17 FIS Cross-Country World Cup, débuting for Ireland in Lillehammer, Norway, on 2 December 2016 and also taking part in further World Cup races in Estonia and Sweden.

He competed for Ireland at the FIS Nordic World Ski Championships 2017 in Lahti, Finland, one of five Irish participants in the championships. In his world championship début in the Men's sprint on 23 February 2017, Westgård ranked as number 77, while at the Men's 30 kilometre pursuit on 25 February 2017, he came in last of the participating contestants. He achieved his best result of the championship in the Men's 15 kilometre classical on 1 March 2017, ranking as 49th. Westgård brought a three-man team to the FIS Nordic World Ski Championships 2017, including his father as a helper and Irish cross-country skier Dominic McAleenan as team manager.

Westgård participated in the 2018 Winter Olympics and the 2022 Winter Olympics, representing Ireland.

Cross-country skiing results
All results are sourced from the International Ski Federation (FIS).

Olympic Games

Distance reduced to 30 km due to weather conditions.

World Championships

World Cup

Season standings

References

External links

1995 births
Living people
People from Leka, Norway
People from Meråker
Irish people of Norwegian descent
Norwegian people of Irish descent
Irish male cross-country skiers
Tour de Ski skiers
Cross-country skiers at the 2018 Winter Olympics
Cross-country skiers at the 2022 Winter Olympics
Olympic cross-country skiers of Ireland